Ted Williams (23 May 1912 – 25 July 1964) was an  Australian rules footballer who played with Hawthorn in the Victorian Football League (VFL).

Notes

External links 

1912 births
1964 deaths
Australian rules footballers from Victoria (Australia)
Hawthorn Football Club players